Rubén Hugo Marín (born May 1, 1934) is a former Argentine Senator for La Pampa Province. He was also a governor of the province on two occasions.
Marín, a lawyer by profession, is a member of the Argentine Justicialist Party.

Born in Trenel, Marín enrolled at the National University of La Plata, and graduated with a juris doctor in 1961. He was Peronist gubernatorial candidate Aquiles Regazzoli's running mate in 1973, and served as Vice Governor of La Pampa from 1973 to 1976. Marín was elected governor in 1983 upon the restoration of democracy, serving until 1987. He was then elected to the Argentine Chamber of Deputies, and two years later, to the Senate. 

Voters returned Marín to the governor's post in 1991, and he was re-elected in 1995 and 1999. He was elected to the Senate in 2003; there, he joined the majority Front for Victory parliamentary group, supporting the national government of President Néstor Kirchner.  

Marín unsuccessfully ran for a fifth term as governor in 2007, but was defeated in party primaries by the faction headed by Carlos Verna. Marín's term in the Senate expired on December 10, 2009.

External links
Senate profile

References

1934 births
Living people
People from La Pampa Province
National University of La Plata alumni
20th-century Argentine lawyers
Members of the Argentine Senate for La Pampa
Justicialist Party politicians
Governors of La Pampa Province
Vice Governors of La Pampa Province
Members of the Argentine Chamber of Deputies elected in La Pampa